Self-Indulgence (Cantonese: fong3 zung3) is the second album by Sandy Lam, released under CBS Records in 1986. This album achieved a platinum level (50,000 units) in the summer of 1986.

Track listing
 Anger (放縱)
 Cupid's Holiday (愛神 Holiday)
 Am I your love tomorrow? (明天是否愛我)
 Save me, quick! (快快救我)
 Kiss (偷吻)
 Heartbreak Alley (心碎巷)
 Crazy for me (為我心痴)
 Corner of the street (長街的一角)
 I am yours already (但我已給你)
 Heart adventure (心裡探險)

Alternate versions
Anger (Lonely Mix)--Released under "Summer Remix 1986" CBS record 1986
Heartbreak Alley (Heartbreak Mix)--Released under "Heartbreak Alley EP" CBS record 1986
Cupid's Holiday (Holiday Mix)--Released under "Heartbreak Alley EP" CBS record 1986
Heartbreak Alley (Special Mix)--Released under "Heartbreak Alley EP" CBS record 1986

References

Sandy Lam albums
1986 albums